= HK Golfer Magazine =

Monthly golf magazine from Hong Kong

- Frequency: Monthly
- First issue: August 1, 2002
- Country: Hong Kong
- Based in: Hong Kong

HK Golfer Magazine was a monthly golf and lifestyle magazine, published in Hong Kong.

Endorsed as the “Official Publication of the Hong Kong Golf Association”,
